JBR may refer to:

 JonBenét Ramsey (1990–1996), American child beauty pageant contestant and murder victim.
 "Jingle Bell Rock", a popular Christmas song first released by Bobby Helms in 1957
 Jumeirah Beach Residence, a gross floor area waterfront community located against the Persian Gulf
 Jung Bahadur Rana (1817–1877), former Nepalese prime minister
 other prime ministers of the Rana dynasty
 Jonesboro Municipal Airport, the airport serving Jonesboro, Arkansas. IATA code is JBR.
 JetBrains Runtime, a custom flavor of OpenJDK.